State Route 119 (SR 119) is a primary state highway in the U.S. state of Virginia.  Known as Calvary Road, the state highway runs  from the North Carolina state line, where the highway continues as North Carolina Highway 119 (NC 119), north to U.S. Route 58 (US 58)/US 360 at Delila.

Route description

SR 119 begins at the North Carolina state line in southwestern Halifax County.  The highway continues south as NC 119 through the northeastern corner of Caswell County to Semora.  SR 119 heads north as a two-lane undivided road through a mix of forest and farmland.  The state highway passes Calvary Cemetery about halfway between the state line and the highway's northern terminus at US 58/US 360 (Philpott Road) at the hamlet of Delila between Danville and South Boston.

Major intersections

References

External links

Virginia Highways Project: VA 119

119
State Route 119